Jane Rolfe (October 10, 1650 – January 26–27, 1676) was the granddaughter of Pocahontas and English colonist John Rolfe, (credited with introducing a strain of tobacco for export by the struggling Virginia Colony).
Her husband was Colonel Robert Bolling, who lived from 1646 to 1709. Robert and Jane had one son, John Bolling (1676–1729).

Biography
Jane Rolfe was born in Varina, Henrico County, Virginia on October 10, 1650 to Thomas Rolfe and his wife, Jane Poythress, whose parents were Francis Poythress and Alice Payton of England. Thomas Rolfe was the son of John Rolfe and his wife, Pocahontas.

Jane Rolfe married Robert Bolling of Prince George County, Virginia.  Their son, John Bolling, was born on January 27, 1676. Jane is said to have died shortly after giving birth.

John Bolling married Mary Kennon, daughter of Richard Kennon and Elizabeth Worsham of Conjurer's Neck.  The couple had six surviving children, each of whom married and had surviving children.

Jane Rolfe's interment was near her father in the Kippax Plantation, but her birth year was never engraved on her headstone.

References

External links

1650 births
1676 deaths
American people of English descent
American people of Powhatan descent
Bolling family of Virginia
Rolfe family of Virginia
People from Henrico County, Virginia